Vistula Offensive can refer to:
 Soviet westward offensive of 1918–1919
 Soviet Vistula-Oder Offensive in 1945